The Canton of Île d'Oléron is an administrative division on the Oléron Island in the department of Charente-Maritime, western France. It was created at the French canton reorganisation which came into effect in March 2015. Its seat is in Saint-Pierre-d'Oléron.

It consists of the following communes:

La Brée-les-Bains
Le Château-d'Oléron
Dolus-d'Oléron
Le Grand-Village-Plage
Saint-Denis-d'Oléron
Saint-Georges-d'Oléron
Saint-Pierre-d'Oléron
Saint-Trojan-les-Bains

References

Cantons of Charente-Maritime